Woonpaikia is a genus of moths in the family Lecithoceridae. The genus was erected by Kyu-Tek Park in 2010.

Species
 Woonpaikia angoonae Park, 2010
 Woonpaikia villosa Park, 2010

References

Lecithocerinae
Moth genera